Omutninsk is a town and the administrative center of Omutninsky District in Kirov Oblast, Russia. Population:

History
It was first mentioned in 1773; town status was granted to it in 1921.

Administrative and municipal status
Within the framework of administrative divisions, Omutninsk serves as the administrative center of Omutninsky District. As an administrative division, it is, together with four rural localities, incorporated within Omutninsky District as the Town of Omutninsk. As a municipal division, the Town of Omutninsk is incorporated within Omutninsky Municipal District as Omutninskoye Urban Settlement.

Research
The Institute of Applied Biochemistry is situated near Omutninsk. According to Dr. Ken Alibek, a biological warfare expert, it was (and possibly still is) a combined pesticide production facility and reserve biological weapons production plant that could be activated in time of war.

References

Notes

Sources

External links
Official website of Omutninsk 
Omutninsk metallurgical factory

Cities and towns in Kirov Oblast
Glazovsky Uyezd